Count Károly Csáky de Körösszeg et Adorján (10 April 1873 – 30 April 1945) was a Hungarian military officer and politician, who served as Minister of Defence between 1923 and 1929. During World War I he fought on the Eastern Front, where he seriously injured. After the establishment of the Hungarian Soviet Republic he demobilized. In 1923 István Bethlen appointed him as Minister of Defence. As a minister he favoured the Allies examining the cessation of its commission's function, and he covered the gun-running being directed into the country. He also supported the Austrian Heimwehr in the interest of a right wing extremist military coup. In 1929 he resigned from his position. His father was Albin Csáky, a former Minister of Education.

References
 Magyar Életrajzi Lexikon

1873 births
1945 deaths
People from Levoča District
Hungarians in Slovakia
Defence ministers of Hungary
Hungarian soldiers
Austro-Hungarian military personnel of World War I
Austro-Hungarian Army officers
Karoly, Csaky